The Poplar Borer (Saperda calcarata) is a species of beetle in the family Cerambycidae. It was described by Thomas Say in 1824. It is known from Canada and the United States. It contains the varietas Saperda calcarata var. adspersa.

References

calcarata
Beetles described in 1824